The 2010 World Junior Short Track Speed Skating Championships took place between 8 and 10 January 2010 in Taipei, Taiwan at the Taipei Arena.  The World Championships are organised by the ISU which also run world cups and championships in speed skating and figure skating.

Medal summary

Medal table

Men's events

Women's events

See also
Short track speed skating
World Junior Short Track Speed Skating Championships

External links
 Official Website
 Results book

World Junior Short Track Speed Skating Championships
World Junior Short Track Speed Skating Championships
World Junior Short Track Speed Skating Championships
Sports competitions in Taipei
International sports competitions hosted by Taiwan
World Junior Short Track Speed Skating Championships
World Junior Short Track Speed Skating
2010s in Taipei